Ninella is a genus of fusulinicean forams from the Lower Carboniferous included in the family Ozawainellidae and subfamily Pseudostaffellinae.

Further reading 

Carboniferous life
Foraminifera genera